Saint Michael and Saint George may refer to:

 Order of St Michael and St George, a British order of chivalry
 Palace of St. Michael and St. George or Palaia Anaktora, a residence in Corfu, Greece
 St Michael and St George Cathedral, Grahamstown, an Anglican cathedral in South Africa
 Cathedral of St Michael and St George, Aldershot a Roman Catholic cathedral in England

See also
 San Jorge, San Miguel, a municipality in El Salvador
 Cathedral of St Michael and St George (disambiguation)
 Saint Michael (disambiguation)
 Saint George (disambiguation)